Putzer or Pützer  is a German language habitational surname. Notable people with the name include:
 Friedrich Pützer (1871–1922), German architect and urban planner
 Joseph Putzer (1836–1904), Austrian Redemptorist theologian
 Karen Putzer (1978), former Italian alpine skier

References 

German-language surnames
German toponymic surnames